Jake Moody (born November 23, 1999) is an American football placekicker for the Michigan Wolverines. He won the 2021 Lou Groza Award and was the consensus first-team placekicker on the 2021 college football All-America team.

Early life and high school caereer
Moody attended Northville High School in Northville, Michigan. He played both football and baseball (as a third baseman) at Northville High.

College career
Moody committed to Michigan in February 2018. He initially committed without a scholarship but was put on scholarship in June 2018.

As a true freshman in 2018, Moody set a Michigan single-game record with six field goals in a 31–20 victory over Indiana. In April 2020, he set a personal record in practice with a 69-yard field goal.

As a senior in 2021, he successfully converted 22 of 24 field goal attempts and 56 of 56 extra point kicks. He also kicked a game-winning field goal in the fourth quarter against Nebraska on October 9. His 122 points led the 2021 Michigan Wolverines football team in scoring. He was named the 2021 Bakken–Andersen Big Ten Kicker of the Year and Lou Groza Award winner.

Moody returned for a fifth season in 2022, taking advantage of the extra year of eligibility granted due to the 2020 season being impacted by the COVID-19 pandemic. He went 5-for-5 on field goals, including a career-long 54-yard kick, against Michigan State on October 29, 2022.

With his third-quarter extra point on November 5, 2022, in a game against Rutgers, Moody became the fifth player in Michigan history to reach 300 career points. With his first-quarter extra point on November 12 in a game against Nebraska, Moody became the third player in Michigan history to record consecutive seasons with 100-plus points, following Anthony Thomas (1999–2000) and Tom Harmon (1939–40). With four field goals against Illinois on November 19, 2022, including the game-winner with nine seconds left, Moody became the Michigan career field goal leader, with 65, passing Garrett Rivas, and tied Remy Hamilton's single-season mark of 25. 

For the 2022 regular season, Moody converted 26 of 32 field goal attempts for an average of 81.25%.  He also converted 53 of 53 kicks for point after touchdown. He also led Michigan with 131 points scored. With Moody's field goal in the second quarter during the 2022 Fiesta Bowl, he broke Desmond Howard's single-season scoring record (138 points) set in 1991, and finished with 147 points during the season. Moody finished his career with 355 points, setting a new all-time Michigan scoring record, surpassing the previous record of 354 points set by Garrett Rivas. He also set the program record for longest field goal made at 59-yards, surpassing the previous record of 57-yards held by Quinn Nordin and Hayden Epstein.

References

External links
 Michigan Wolverines bio

2000 births
Living people
American football placekickers
Michigan Wolverines football players
People from Northville, Michigan
Players of American football from Michigan
All-American college football players